The 2014 League1 Ontario season was the inaugural season of the Division 3 Ontario-based semi-professional soccer league. It began on May 30, featuring 10 teams. The league's first ever goal was scored by Toronto FC Academy player Dylan Sacramento.

Teams 

Being the first year of the league, all teams are new to the league.

On July 22, 2014, the league terminated the license of Internacional de Toronto.  Their record will be expunged.

Format 

Unlike most North American sports leagues, there will be no playoffs. The title will be awarded to the team with the most points at the end of the 16-game regular season. League1 Ontario also expressed the desire to organize a final game between their champion, and the winner of the other Division 3 league in Canada, the PLSQ.
There will also be a cup competition for the 10 teams, the final representing the last game of the season. This cup is unrelated to the Canadian Championship, though the Canadian Soccer Association has hinted at the possibility of including more teams in the future.

Standings

Statistics

Top scorers 

Source:

Player of the week 

|}

Cup 
In addition to the regular season, the 2014 League1 Ontario season also contained a cup tournament, which was run separately (and consisted of different games) from the rest of the regular season.  The initial ten teams were divided into two groups of five, with each team facing the other teams in their group once.  The top two teams from each group advanced to the knockout stage.

Group stage 
The teams were divided into two groups of 5, with the best 2 teams in each group qualifying for the semifinals.  With the removal of Internacional de Toronto, Group A was reduced to four teams.

Group A

Group B

Knockout stage 
The top two teams from each group entered a single-game elimination tournament to determine the cup champion.  The final was held on Sunday, October 19 at BMO Field.

Semifinals

Finals

Inter-Provincial Cup Championship 
The Inter-Provincial Cup Championship was announced on October 14, 2014 as a two-legged home-and-away series between the league champions of League1 Ontario and the Première Ligue de soccer du Québec – the only Division 3 men's semi-professional soccer leagues based fully within Canada.

Toronto FC Academy won 4–0 on aggregate

Awards 

The following players were named the League1 Ontario Top XI.
 League1 Ontario Top XI

The following players were named the League1 Ontario Next XI.
 League1 Ontario Next XI

The following players were named the League1 Ontario Young Stars.
 League1 Ontario Young Stars

References

External links 

League1
League1 Ontario seasons